Ruhollah Beigi Eilanlu (born 1973) is an Iranian shiite cleric and politician.

Beigi Sadr was born in Miandoab, West Azerbaijan.  He is a member of the 9th Islamic Consultative Assembly from the electorate of Miandoab, Shahin Dezh and Takab with Mehdi Isazadeh. and member of Iran-Turkey Friendship society. Beighi won with 79,260 (35.42%) votes.

References

People from Miandoab
Deputies of Miandoab, Shahin Dezh and Takab
Living people
1973 births
Members of the 9th Islamic Consultative Assembly
Followers of Wilayat fraction members